The 1976 Brisbane Rugby League season was the 69th season of Brisbane Rugby League premiership. Eight rugby league teams from across Brisbane competed for the premiership, which culminated in a grand final match between the Western Suburbs and Eastern Suburbs clubs.

Season summary 
Teams played each other three times, with 21 rounds of competition played. It resulted in a top five of Eastern Suburbs, Western Suburbs, Past Brothers, Redcliffe and Wynnum-Manly. However, Wynnum-Manly and Southern Suburbs finished the season equal on points, with Magpies defeating Seagulls in a mid-week play-off.

The 1976 season's Rothmans Medallist was Northern Suburbs forward Darryl Brohman. Brohman would later sign for Sydney club Penrith and feature for Canterbury in its 1984 NSWRL grand final win.

Teams

Ladder

Finals

Grand Final 

Western Suburbs made it two premierships in succession, after defeating favourites Eastern Suburbs in an anticlimactic decider.

Easts' solitary point was a field goal by second-rower John Payne, who temporarily gave Tigers the lead in the first-half.

Man of the match Gary Prickett scored the opening try for Wests, with lock John Ribot scoring the second just before half-time. Wests lead 12–1 at half-time and effectively repelled all Easts' efforts in the second-half.

The match was virtually without incident. The most blatant was a high tackle by John Payne on Wests' prop, Max Williamson. Williamson had to be helped from the field, with Payne receiving a long lecture from referee Bernie Pramberg.

Western Suburbs 16 (Tries: Gary Prickett, John Ribot. Goals: 5)

Eastern Suburbs 1 (Field goal: John Payne)

References

Rugby league in Brisbane
Brisbane Rugby League season